Romuald Gierasieński (6 February 1885 – 21 June 1956) was a Polish actor. He appeared in eleven films between 1920 and 1939.

Selected filmography
 Co mój mąż robi w nocy (1934)
 Córka generała Pankratowa (1934)
 Panienka z poste restante (1935)
 Znachor (1937)
 Doctor Murek (1939)

References

External links

1885 births
1956 deaths
Polish male film actors
Polish male silent film actors
Polish male stage actors
Actors from Lublin
People from Lublin Governorate
Polish cabaret performers
20th-century Polish male actors
20th-century comedians